Brigadier William Charles Douglas Veale,  (16 May 1895 – 17 August 1971), generally known as W. C. D. Veale, was an Australian engineer, surveyor and soldier. He is best known as the longtime (1947–1965) town clerk of the Adelaide City Council, and had significant influence in the development and change of character of the City of Adelaide during that period. For example, in conjunction with four-time Lord Mayor of Adelaide, Arthur Campbell Rymill, Veale was responsible for significant improvements to the Adelaide Park Lands. He was also a senior soldier and military engineer who served in both the First and Second World Wars, and is notable for his involvement in the Battle of Timor and during the Japanese occupation of the Dutch East Indies.

Veale Gardens in Adelaide's South Parklands is named in his honour.

Early years
Veale was born in Bendigo on 16 May 1895, and educated locally. He was later apprenticed to an engineer at the Whittlesea Council in Morang, Victoria.

First World War
Veale enlisted in the Australian Imperial Force on 14 February 1916. In October 1917, while he was one of a party marking out an assembly position, the party came under fire and several of the party were seriously wounded. While under continuous shell fire, Veale attended to all of their wounds, got them to safety and then successfully marked out the assembly position. "For conspicuous gallantry and devotion to duty", he was awarded the Distinguished Conduct Medal.

Veale was commissioned lieutenant in May 1918. While on operations in the Somme, France, in August 1918, in a single night when under enemy shelling, he supervised the construction of two bridges required for use by the infantry next morning, without alerting the enemy. For this deed he was awarded the Military Cross.

Interbellum

After a period working at Stoke-on-Trent and the Ministry of Transport in London, Veale returned to Victoria, serving as engineer to the Shire of Kowree Council at Edenhope. He married Eileen Guest at All Saints' Church of England, Bright, on 12 February 1923.

On 8 October 1923 Veale became Assistant City Engineer and Surveyor to the City of Adelaide at an annual salary of A£450. In 1926 he became Deputy City Engineer, and City Engineer in 1929. During this period he served with the Citizens Military Force, rising to the rank of colonel.

Second World War

Prior to and during the Second World War, Veale held the following positions and commands:

Post-war and retirement
Veale was appointed town clerk in January 1947, and retired in November 1965.

He died on 17 August 1971, aged 76, in North Adelaide and was cremated.

Honours and awards
Commander of the Order of the British Empire (CBE) – 10 June 1954
Military Cross (MC) – 1 February 1919
Distinguished Conduct Medal (DCM) – 1918
Efficiency Decoration (ED)
Fellow of the Royal Australian Planning Institute. He was federal president (1954–55).
Fellow of the Institute of Municipal Administration

References

External links
William Charles Douglas Veale, CBE, MC, DCM, adelaidia.sa.gov.au
Temporary Brigadier W C D Veale, www.awm.gov.au
William Charles Douglas VEALE MC DCM, RSL Virtual War Memorial

1895 births
1971 deaths
Military personnel from Victoria (Australia)
Australian brigadiers
20th-century Australian engineers
Australian Commanders of the Order of the British Empire
Australian military personnel of World War I
Australian Army personnel of World War II
Australian recipients of the Distinguished Conduct Medal
Australian recipients of the Military Cross
Australian surveyors
People from Adelaide
People from Bendigo